Phyu Phyu Win (born 1 December 2004) is a Burmese footballer who plays as a defender for YREO FC and the Myanmar women's national team.

References

External links

2004 births
Living people
Women's association football defenders
Burmese women's footballers
Sportspeople from Yangon
Myanmar women's international footballers